Leopard, Seebär & Co. is a German television series.

External links
 

Television series about mammals
Television shows set in Hamburg
2007 German television series debuts
2013 German television series endings
German-language television shows
Das Erste original programming